Rogersville may refer to:

Places
Canada
Rogersville, New Brunswick
Rogersville Parish, New Brunswick
United States
Rogersville, Alabama
Rogersville, California
Rogersville, Indiana, an unincorporated community
Rogersville, Iowa
Rogersville, Missouri
Rogersville, Tennessee
Rogersville, Wisconsin, an unincorporated community